Tokyo 7th district was a constituency of the House of Representatives in the Diet of Japan (national legislature). Between 1947 and 1993 it elected five, later four representatives by single non-transferable vote. It initially consisted of mainland Western Tokyo as a whole, namely the cities of Hachiōji and Tachikawa and the Nishitama, Minamitama and Kitatama districts of Tokyo.

For the election of 1976, Western parts were split off to form the new 11th district. As of 1993, the 7th district consisted of the cities of Tachikawa, Musashino, Mitaka, Akishima, Koganei, Kodaira, Higashimurayama, Kokubunji, Kunitachi, Tanashi, Hōya, Higashiyamato, Kiyose, Higashikurume and Musashimurayama. Following the redistricting, the ruling Liberal Democratic Party (LDP) never managed to have more than one of their candidates elected as center-left to left parties dominated the vote. In the 1986 election, the LDP stopped nominating two candidates and Kiyoshi Ozawa (later minister during the coalition with the Socialist Party) became the party's only candidate in Tokyo 7th district.

Since the electoral reform of 1994 the area is distributed over several single-member districts. The four last representatives for Tokyo 7 all ran again in the election of 1996, the first under the new system: Naoto Kan won the 18th district, Yuriko Ōno the 20th district; Kiyoshi Ozawa ran, but lost the 21st district to Democrat Jōji Yamamoto, and Kōichirō Watanabe failed to win the 19th district against Democratic newcomer Yoshinori Suematsu.

Summary of results during the 1955 party system

Elected Representatives

Last election result 1993

References 

Districts of the House of Representatives (Japan)
Politics of Tokyo